Christmas with Elvis and the Royal Philharmonic Orchestra (also known as Christmas with Elvis) is a compilation album by American singer Elvis Presley (1935–77). It was released on October 6, 2017, by RCA Records and Legacy Recordings. It is the third album recorded with the Royal Philharmonic Orchestra, following If I Can Dream (2015) and The Wonder of You (2016), both of which topped the UK Albums Chart. The album features archival vocal recordings of Elvis from the albums Elvis' Christmas Album (1957) and Elvis sings The Wonderful World of Christmas (1971) accompanied by new orchestral arrangements by the Royal Philharmonic Orchestra. A deluxe edition of the album, which contains four new tracks, was released on November 24, 2017.

Commercial performance
The album debuted at number one on the Billboard Classical Albums chart (for the issue dated October 28, 2017). In the UK, it debuted at number 22 on the UK Albums Chart, selling 3,572 units in its first week. However, it reached a new peak of number six on December 1, 2017, following the release of the deluxe edition. It was awarded Gold certification by BPI reflecting sales of over 100,000 copies.

Track listing

Charts

Weekly charts

Year-end charts

Certifications

References

2017 compilation albums
Elvis Presley compilation albums
Christmas compilation albums
2017 Christmas albums
Royal Philharmonic Orchestra albums
Albums produced by Nick Patrick (record producer)
Compilation albums published posthumously
Priscilla Presley
Christmas albums by American artists